Editrice il Sirente is an Italian book publisher with specialisms in human rights and international law, Arabic fiction and comics, investigation, actuality.

The company was founded in 1998. The catalog, including works of nonfiction on topics mainly attributable to politics and international law, works of fiction and fantastic intertwined with the theme of marginality as detailed in the manifesto Pensieri dal carcere (Quelques messages personnels) by Pierre Clémenti.
In his long catalog provides many Canadian authors such as Hubert Aquin, François Barcelo, Norman Nawrocki, Gaëtan Brulotte and Italian Giovanni Conso, Piero Fassino, Flavia Lattanzi, Umberto Leanza, Antonio Marchesi, Danilo Zolo, and Paolo Benvenuti. Among others, more recently, some Arab writers like Khaled Al Khamissi, Nawal al-Sa‘dawi and Magdy El Shafee of the series Altriarabi, and others like Steve LeVine in the series Inchieste.

Principal authors published

:
Topi, Eneida

:
Ondjaki

:
Almino, João
Carvalho, Bernardo

:
Aquin, Hubert
Barcelo, François
Carpentier, André
Brulotte, Gaëtan
Nawrocki, Norman
 Schabas, William A.

:
 Aladdin, Muhammad
 Khamissi, Khaled Al
 El Kamhawi, Ezzat
 Nàgi, Ahmed
 Sa‘dawi, Nawal al-
 Shafee, Magdy El

:
 Al Galidi, Rodaan

:
Clémenti, Pierre
Ruiller, Jerome
Guène, Faïza
Adimi, Kaouther
Azzeddine, Saphia

:
Khider, Abbas

:
Blasim, Hassan

:
 Benvenuti, Paolo
 Chiuppani, Beppe
 Conso, Giovanni
 Di Pasquale, Massimiliano
 Fassino, Piero
 Latino, Agostina
 Lattanzi, Flavia
 Leanza, Umberto
 Marchesi, Antonio
 Moccia, Gabriele
 Prikedelik
 Santori, Valeria
 Zeno-Zencovich, Vincenzo
 Zolo, Danilo

:
Zankoul, Maya

:
Abu Oksa Daoud, Suheir
Bakriyyah, Raja'
Hlehel, Ala
Musallam, Akram
Naffa', Hisham
Shalash, Bashir
Taha, Muhammad Ali

:
 Dibo, Mohammed
 Haji, Golan
 Sirees, Nihad

:
LeVine, Steve
 Spitzmiller, Rebecca

:
Mpe, Phaswane

:
Dabbagh, Selma
Sukkar, Sumia

:
Daniel David Ntanda Nsereko

Series

Diritto (1999)
Series devoted to essays on international law.

Fuori (2007)
Series open, graphically represented as a cyclical book: the front cover is the first page of the novel to give the reader a chance to plunge immediately into the story, until graphic image placed on the back cover, giving the reader a chance to continue reading, again from the beginning. The first issue comes out on November 3, 2007.

Altriarabi (2008)
Series dedicated to the contemporary and unaligned voices of Arab world. The first issue comes out on September 13, 2008.

Altriarabi Migrante (2015)
In 2015 born the sub-series Migrante dedicated to the Arabic second and third generation of writers in Europe, selected for EU co-funding. The project’s supports cultural and linguistic diversity, promotes the transnational circulation of European literature and intends to achieve the widest possible accessibility. It undertakes the translation of eight works from five countries in the EU (France, Germany, Netherlands, Sweden, and the UK) into Italian.

Inchieste (2009)
Series dedicated to news reports.

Nuovi percorsi (2011)
Series devoted to topical subjects, published under license Creative Commons and available in version eBook on the web.

Comunità alternative (2011)
Ten works closed series devoted to post-colonial literature, where are explored forms of interpersonal relationship born of unconventional approaches to sexual identity, ethnicity, cultural and religious diversity, thus offering new ways of conception of social and human relations.

Awards and honors
 On December 4, 2014, the publishing house has received the «Special Award Franco Cuomo International Award» for the «development of new forms of cultural expression, social and human of our time».
 Creative Europe Literally Translation 2015: The Project «Altriarabi Migrante» consists of seven volumes. The selection includes works published between 2003–2014 by European Authors of Arab origin (1°-2° generation), born from 1971 to 1992, from France, United Kingdom, Germany and Netherlands (countries with the highest percentage of Arab immigrants). The books have a high quality, which has allowed them to win prizes. The works are characterized by an analysis of the sense of belonging and national identity, torn between the land of origin, modernity and Europe and the discomfort this conflict brings. Strong themes of cultural hybridization emerge: in some works it arises from a language mixed with Arabic words and hybrid structures between new and original language. There is a constant reformulation of power relations between real and symbolic centres and fringes.
 Librinfestival 2016 as «Best Publisher»: E se fossi morto? (Kaman Yushaid mawtihi, 2012) by Mohammed Dibo, 2015.
 Librinfestival 2017 as «Best Book»: Il ragazzo di Aleppo che ha dipinto la guerra (The boy from Aleppo, 2013) by Sumia Sukkar, 2016.

Notes
This article was based substantially on its counterpart in the Italian Wikipedia, il Sirente.

External links

Book publishing companies of Italy
Publishing companies established in 1998